The 1988 UK Athletics Championships was the national championship in outdoor track and field for the United Kingdom held at Moorways Stadium, Derby. It was the second time that the English city hosted the event, continuing on from the 1987 UK Championships.

It was the twelfth edition of the competition limited to British athletes only, launched as an alternative to the AAA Championships, which was open to foreign competitors. However, due to the fact that the calibre of national competition remained greater at the AAA event, the UK Championships this year were not considered the principal national championship event by some statisticians, such as the National Union of Track Statisticians (NUTS). Many of the athletes below also competed at the 1988 AAA Championships.

Fatima Whitbread won her eighth consecutive women's javelin throw UK title, while shot putter Judy Oakes won a fifth straight title. Diana Davies extended her winning streak to three in the women's high jump and Paula Dunn repeated her sprint double of 1987. Three men defended their 1987 titles: Tony Jarrett (110 m hurdles), Paul Mardle (discus) and Dave Smith (hammer). Elaine McLaughlin (400 m hurdles) and Mary Berkeley (long jump) were the other women to retain their titles.

The main international track and field competition for the United Kingdom that year was the Olympic Games. Three UK champions went on to win Olympic silver in Seoul: Linford Christie, Liz McColgan and Fatima Whitbread. Colin Jackson only ran the 100 m at the UK Championships, but took a silver in his hurdles speciality at the Olympics.

Medal summary

Men

Women

References

UK Athletics Championships
UK Outdoor Championships
Athletics Outdoor
Sport in Derby
Athletics competitions in England
1980s in Derby